Southland Girls' High School is a state girls' Year 7–13 secondary school in Georgetown, Invercargill, New Zealand.

The school was established in 1879. It is a single-sex state school for years 7 to 13 with a roll of  students as of  From the 1880s to 1907 it shared a site with Southland Boys' High School and senior girls attended some classes at the boys' school. It moved to the current site in 1947.

It consists of two main school blocks, one the former Tweedsmuir Junior High School. Students of all ages are mixed around the classrooms to involve all students thoroughly in school life, and one uniform is worn by all year levels. The students also wear red shoes with their uniforms.  Two-yearly musical dramas are produced in conjunction with Southland Boys' High School.

The 2005 NZQA report commended the school and staff for the very good practices and consistently high standards.

A new school gymnasium was officially opened in 2007 by Sport and Recreation Minister Trevor Mallard.

Enwood House is the Southland Girls' High School hostel for boarders between years 7 and 13. Enwood House provides 24 hour care for boarders with night staff on duty at all times. Girls can stay Monday to Friday or full-time, and short term stays are available.

Notable alumnae

 Genevieve Behrent (born 1990), rower
 Ann Chapman (1935–2009), limnologist and first woman to lead an Antarctic expedition
 Jean Herbison (1923–2007), academic and educator
 Rose Hinchey (1910–1981), military nurse
 Molly Macalister (1920–1979), artist
 Clare Mallory (1913–1991), children's writer
 Alena Saili (born 1998), rugby sevens player

References

External links
 School website
 School Ultranet

Boarding schools in New Zealand
Educational institutions established in 1879
Girls' schools in New Zealand
Secondary schools in Southland, New Zealand
Schools in Invercargill
1879 establishments in New Zealand